Be Not Nobody is the debut studio album by American singer-songwriter Vanessa Carlton, released on April 30, 2002, through A&M Records.
As of late 2004 the album had sold 1.38 million copies in the US according to Nielsen SoundScan, and Variety magazine reported in July 2003 that it had sold 2.3 million worldwide.  Billboard magazine placed Carlton at number twenty-one on its year-end "Top Pop Artists" list for 2002.

"A Thousand Miles" was released as the lead single from the album and reached the top five on the US Billboard Hot 100, number one in Australia and the top ten in the United Kingdom. Be Not Nobody was certified gold by the RIAA in June 2002, and platinum in October 2002. "Ordinary Day" charted inside the top forty on the US Hot 100. "Pretty Baby" was remixed and released as the album's third and final single in early 2003. After the single's release, subsequent pressings of the album contained the remixed single version of the song in place of its original album version. "Pretty Baby" did not appear on the Hot 100 or the UK top seventy-five, but was nominated for a 2003 Teen Choice Award for "Choice Love Song".

Track listing
All songs were written by Vanessa Carlton, except where noted.
 "Ordinary Day" – 3:57
 "Unsung" – 4:20
 "A Thousand Miles" – 3:57
 "Pretty Baby" – 4:08
 "Rinse" – 4:30
 "Sway" – 3:57
 "Paradise" – 4:50
 "Prince" – 4:10
 "Paint It Black" (Mick Jagger, Keith Richards) – 3:30
 "Wanted" – 3:55
 "Twilight" – 4:50
UK bonus track
 "Wanted" (Ripe Mix) – 3:55
Japanese bonus tracks
 "Twilight" (Live)
 "Wanted" (Ripe Mix) – 3:55

Personnel
Credits adapted from AllMusic and album's liner notes.

}

Musicians
 Vanessa Carlton – piano, vocals
 Abe Laboriel Jr. – drums
 John Goux – guitar, dulcimer, sitar
 Leland Sklar – bass guitar
 Ron Fair – vibraphone, organ, harmonica
 Alex Al – electric upright bass (8)
 Chuck Berghofer – upright bass (7)
 Luis Conte – percussion

Orchestra
 Endre Granat , Eun Mee Ahn, Jackie Brand, Charlie Bisharat , Becky Bunnell, Bruce Dukov, Franklyn D'Antonio, Mario de León, Joel Derouin, Armen Garabedian, Berj Garabedian, Alan Grunfeld, Clayton Haslop, Tamara Hatwan, Amy Hershberger, Lily HoChen, Kirstin Fife, Tiffany Hu, Natalie Leggett, Phillip Levy, Rene Mandel, Robin Olson, Sid Page, Sara Parkins, Katia Popov, Barbara Porter, Marie Robertson, Anatoly Rosinsky, John Wittenberg, Margaret Wooten, Ken Yerke – violin
 Dmitri Boviard, Paul Cohen, Matt Cooker, Brian Dembow, Karen Elaine, Marlow Fisher, Sam Formacola, Keith Grezen, Vicky Miskolczy, Simon Oswell, Karen van Sant, David Walther – viola
 Bob Adcock, Larry Corbett, Steve Erdody, Suzie Katayama, Armen Ksadjikian, Tim Landauer, David Low, Cecilia Tsan – cello
 Nico Abandolo, Trey Henry, Mike Valerio – double bass
 Gayle Levant – harp
 Rose Corrigan, Cindy Ellis, Susan Greenberg, Dan Higgins , David Shostac, Sheridon Stokes, Larry Williams – woodwinds
 Emil Richards – vibraphone (11)
 Tommy Morgan – harmonica (11)
 Dan Greco — cymbalon (5)
 Bill Hughes – orchestra contractor

Technical personnel
 Vanessa Carlton – arranger, executive producer
 Ron Fair – production, arranger, executive producer, orchestral arrangements and conductor (1-10)
 Randy Kerber – orchestral arrangements and conductor (11)
 Tal Herzberg – engineer, digital editing
 Jack Joseph Puig – mixing (1-3, 5, 6, 8, 9)
 Michael C. Ross – engineer, mixing (7, 10, 11)
 Hugh Padgham – mixing (4)
 Bill Schnee – additional recording
 Erik Reichers, Bryan Cook, Jeff Rothschild, Jim Danis, Chris Wonzer, J.D. Andrew, Frank G, Brian Vibberts, Chris Steffen, Jay Goin – assistant engineers
 Eddy Schreyer – mastering
 Drew FitzGerald – art direction, additional illustration
 Kurt Iswarienko – photography
 Alan Silfen, Jim Wright – additional photography
 Stephanie Woolf – stylist

Charts

Weekly charts

Year-end charts

Certifications

References

Vanessa Carlton albums
2002 debut albums
Albums produced by Ron Fair
A&M Records albums